Caleb Hinkle is an American politician serving as a member of the Montana House of Representatives from the 68th district. Elected in November 2020, he assumed office on January 4, 2021.

Career 
Hinkle served in the Montana National Guard and is a former Sergeant. Hinkle later worked as the Western Montana field representative for Greg Gianforte. Hinkle was elected to the Montana House of Representatives in November 2020 and assumed office on January 4, 2021.

Muzzleloader Hunting Season
During the 67th Legislative Session, Hinkle brought House Bill 242 that established the muzzleloader season. Before its passage, Montana was the last state to not have a special season set aside for muzzleloaders. The Republican traced the idea to his fascination with history and his father introducing him to movies depicting the use of muzzleloaders during the Civil War and by early fur trappers.

Electoral history

2020 election

2022 general election

References 

1992 births
21st-century American politicians
Republican Party members of the Montana House of Representatives
Living people
People from Butte, Montana
People from Belgrade, Montana
Montana National Guard personnel